Gene Harris (born Eugene Haire, September 1, 1933 – January 16, 2000) was an American jazz pianist known for his warm sound and blues and gospel infused style that is known as soul jazz.

From 1956 to 1970, he played in The Three Sounds trio with bassist Andy Simpkins and drummer Bill Dowdy. During this time, The Three Sounds recorded regularly for Blue Note and Verve.

He mostly retired to Boise, starting in the late 1970s, although he performed regularly at the Idanha Hotel there. Ray Brown convinced him to go back on tour in the early 1980s. He played with the Ray Brown Trio and then led his own groups, recording mostly on Concord Records, until his death from kidney failure in 2000. One of his most popular numbers was his "Battle Hymn of the Republic," a live version of which is on his Live at Otter Crest album, published by Concord. The singer and actress Niki Haris is his daughter.

Discography

As leader

As sideman
 Branching Out (with Nat Adderley, Johnny Griffin) (1958, Riverside)
 A Double Dose of Soul (with James Clay, Nat Adderley) (1960, Riverside)
 Organ-izing (with Melvin Rhyne) (1960, Jazzland)
 Blue Note Live at The Roxy (with the Blue Note All-Stars) (1976, Blue Note)
  'S Wonderful: Concord Jazz Salutes Ira Gershwin (with various artists) (1979, Concord)
 Soul Route (with Milt Jackson Quartet) (1983, Pablo)
 When the Sun Goes Down (with Ernestine Anderson) (1984, Concord)
 Soular Energy (with the Ray Brown Trio) (1984, Concord)
 Don't Forget the Blues (with the Ray Brown All Stars) (1985, Concord)
 The Red Hot Ray Brown Trio (with the Ray Brown Trio) (1985, Concord) recorded live at the 'Blue Note'
 A Gentleman and His Music (with Benny Carter) (1985, Concord)
 Love Me Tender (with Junko Mine and the Ray Brown Trio) (1986, All Art [Japan])
 Summer Wind: Live at The Loa (with the Ray Brown Trio) (1988 [1990], Concord)
 Bam Bam Bam (with the Ray Brown Trio) (1988, Concord) recorded live at the Fujitsu-Concord Jazz Festival
 The 20th Concord Festival All-Stars (with various artists) (1988, Concord)
 Black Orpheus (with the Ray Brown Trio) (1989, Evidence)
 Mr. Blue (with Takashi Ohi and the Ray Brown Trio) (1989, Denon)
 Moore Makes 4 (with Ralph Moore and the Ray Brown Trio) (1990, Concord)
 At Last (Gene Harris/Scott Hamilton Quintet) (1990, Concord)
 Live at The Apollo (with B.B. King) (1990, GRP)
 Concord Jazz Festival: Live 1990 (with various artists) (1990, Concord)
 Concord Jazz Festival: Live 1990, Vol. 3 (with various artists) (1990, Concord)
 Three Dimensional (with the Ray Brown Trio) (1991, Concord)
 A Concord Jazz Christmas (with various artists) (1991, Concord)
 Georgia on My Mind (with the Ray Brown Trio) (1991, All Art [Japan])
 Jazz Celebration: Tribute to Carl Jefferson (with various artists) (1992, Concord)
 Fujitsu-Concord 25th Jazz Festival (with various artists) (1993, Concord)
 Fujitsu-Concord 26th Jazz Festival (with various artists) (1994, Concord)
 I Waited for You (with Mary Stallings) (1994, Concord)
 Spectrum (with Mary Stallings) (1996, Concord)
 It's the Real Soul (with Frank Wess (1996, Concord)
 Down Home Blues (with Jack McDuff) (1997, Concord)
 Dreaming A Dream (with Niki Haris) (1997, BMG)
 Just Friends (with Marian McPartland) (1998, Concord)

Compilations
 The Best of The Three Sounds (with The Three Sounds) (1993, Blue Note)
 Gene Harris: The Concord Jazz Heritage Series (1998, Concord)
 The Blue Note Years (with The Three Sounds) (1999, Blue Note)
 Gene Harris: The Best of the Concord Years (2000, Concord) 2-CD
 The Complete Blue Hour Sessions (The Three Sounds with Stanley Turrentine) (2000, Blue Note) 2-CD
 Big Band Soul (with the Gene Harris Superband) (contains Live At Town Hall, N.Y.C. + World Tour 1990) (2002, Concord) 2-CD
 Swingin' the Blues (2002, Recall) 2-CD
 Ballad Essentials (2003, Concord)
 Live From New York To Tokyo (with the Ray Brown Trio) (contains The Red Hot Ray Brown Trio + Bam Bam Bam) (2003, Concord) 2-CD
 Instant Party (2004, Concord)

References

External links 
Official website
Gene Harris discography
Gene Harris Jazz Festival
Biography (Allmusic via VH1)
Gene Harris on Resonance Records

Honors
The Gene Harris bandshell in Boise's Ann Morrison park is named in his honor.
The Gene Harris Jazz Festival is an annual event in Boise that brings together the best of Boise jazz and education in memory of the city's most famous jazz musician.

1933 births
2000 deaths
Soul-jazz musicians
African-American pianists
American jazz pianists
American male pianists
People from Benton Harbor, Michigan
Blue Note Records artists
Concord Records artists
Jazz musicians from Michigan
20th-century American pianists
20th-century American male musicians
American male jazz musicians
The Three Sounds members
20th-century African-American musicians